Venetico (Sicilian: Venèticu) is a comune (municipality) in the Metropolitan City of Messina in the Italian region Sicily, located about  east of Palermo and about  west of Messina.

Venetico borders the following municipalities: Roccavaldina, Spadafora, Valdina.

References

Cities and towns in Sicily